Deshamanya Professor Nandadasa Kodagoda MRCP, MD was the former Vice Chancellor of the University of Colombo.

He was graduated as a Doctor of Medicine in 1956 and initially worked for government hospitals of Galle, Colombo, & Karawanella. Later in 1958, he joined the academic staff of the Colombo Medical School as a junior lecturer.

Subsequently, he held the positions of Professor of Forensic Medicine of the University of Colombo, Head of the Department of Forensic Medicine, Dean of the Faculty of Medicine before becoming the Vice Chancellor of the Colombo University. He has also served as the Chairman of the National Dangerous Drugs Control Board, and as the Director of the Institute of Indigenous Medicine of the University of Colombo.

He was educated at Nalanda College Colombo and Mahinda College Galle. During the time he spent as a school boy at Mahinda College, Kodagoda was able to keep an unbreakable record in the A/L bio history of Sri Lanka obtaining 396 marks.

References

 

 

 National Awards Conferred by His Excellency the President of Sri Lanka

Sinhalese physicians
Sri Lankan Buddhists
Sinhalese academics
Alumni of Nalanda College, Colombo
People from Galle
Vice-Chancellors of the University of Colombo
1929 births
Living people
Deshamanya
Kala Keerthi
Sri Lankan academics
Academics from Galle